The 2014 Louisville Cardinals men's soccer team represented the University of Louisville during the 2014 NCAA Division I men's soccer season.

See also 

 Louisville Cardinals men's soccer
 2014 Atlantic Coast Conference men's soccer season
 2014 NCAA Division I men's soccer season
 2014 ACC Men's Soccer Tournament
 2014 NCAA Division I Men's Soccer Championship

References 

Louisville Cardinals
Louisville Cardinals men's soccer seasons
Louisville Cardinals men's soccer
Louisville Cardinals